HD 48265 is the Henry Draper Catalogue designation for a star in the southern constellation Puppis. It has an apparent visual magnitude of 8.07, which makes it too faint to be seen with the naked eye.

This star has a stellar classification of G5IV/V, suggesting that, at an age of 4.8 billion years, it has reached an intermediate evolutionary stage between a main sequence star and a subgiant. It has but 93% of the mass of the Sun, while its outer atmosphere has begun to expand, reaching about 2.3 times the Sun's radius. HD 48265 is radiating 62% of the Sun's luminosity from its atmosphere at an effective temperature of 5,508 K, giving it the cool orange glow of a K-type star. Measurement of the chemical abundances of this star indicate that, compared to the Sun, it has a 95% greater proportion of elements other than hydrogen and helium—what astronomers term the star's metallicity.

Planetary system
In October 2008 the planet, HD 48265 b, was reported to be orbiting this star. This object was detected using the radial velocity method during an astronomical survey conducted by the Magellan Planet Search Program using the MIKE echelle spectrograph on the 6.5-m Magellan II (Clay) telescope.
 

As part of the NameExoWorlds project of the IAU, HD 48265 b has been named Naqaỹa ("brother") and HD 48265 Nosaxa ("springtime") in the Moqoit language, as voted by Argentine voters in an online poll.

See also
 List of extrasolar planets

References

External links
 

048265
031895
Puppis
Planetary systems with one confirmed planet
G-type subgiants
Durchmusterung objects
Nosaxa